America Brown is a 2004 American drama film directed by Paul Black, starring Ryan Kwanten, Hill Harper and Natasha Lyonne.

Cast
 Ryan Kwanten as Ricky Brown
 Hill Harper as John Cross
 Natasha Lyonne as Vera
 Karen Black as Marianne Brown
 Élodie Bouchez as Rosie
 Leo Burmester as Bo Williams
 Frankie Faison as Coach Bryant
 Michael Rapaport as Daniel Brown

Release
The film premiered at the Tribeca Film Festival on 9 May 2004.

Reception
Ronnie Scheib of Variety wrote that "Name cast, occasional deft touches and nifty contrast between the two locales cannot overcome script’s terminal awkwardness."

Merle Bertrand of Film Threat rated the film 3 stars out of 5 and called it a "decent, if flawed look at life in the football spotlight".

Kevin Crust of the Los Angeles Times wrote that the "strong" cast is "capable of carrying the dramatic sequences."

References

External links
 
 

American drama films
2004 drama films